Göinge Mekaniska was one of the leading Swedish steel building companies. It was founded in 1946 and in 1997 it was acquired by Skanska. In 2005 Göinge Mekaniska was merged into Skanska.

It was specialized in large buildings like:

large span buildings
hangars
high-bay warehouses
shopping malls
large industrial buildings, etc.

References
  Historik
 Press Release, July 2, 1997 Skanska Acquires Göinge Mekaniska

Defunct companies of Sweden